Luigi Antonio "Dario" Compiani (1 September 1903 – 4 April 1962) was an Italian professional footballer and football manager, who played as a goalkeeper.

Club career 
Throughout his club career, Compiani played for Italian sides Cremonese, Milan, and Sampierdarenese. With 221 appearances for Milan, he is the club's sixth-most capped goalkeeper of all time, behind only Christian Abbiati (380), Sebastiano Rossi (330), Dida (302), Lorenzo Buffon (300), and Enrico Albertosi (233).

External links 
Profile at MagliaRossonera.it 
Profile at EnciclopediadelCalcio.it

References 

1903 births
1962 deaths
Italian footballers
Italian football managers
Association football goalkeepers
Serie A players
U.S. Cremonese players
A.C. Milan players